Mainfranken Theater Würzburg is a theatre in Würzburg, Germany. The new building was designed by the architect Jörg Friedrich.

External links

Theatres in Bavaria
Buildings and structures in Würzburg